The Donna–Río Bravo International Bridge, also known as the Alliance International Bridge, is an international bridge that spans the Rio Grande, providing a crossing of the Mexico–United States border between Donna, Texas and Río Bravo, Tamaulipas. The bridge was opened to traffic on December 14, 2010. Only non-commercial vehicles are permitted to use the bridge, but  there are plans to open it to commercial traffic. On the U.S. side, the bridge connects with Farm to Market Road 493. On the Mexico side, the bridge's access road provides a connection with Mexican Federal Highway 2D.

Border crossing

The Donna Port of Entry is located at the Donna–Río Bravo International Bridge. It is open daily from 6:00 a.m. to 10:00 p.m.

References

International bridges in Texas
Road bridges in Texas
International bridges in Tamaulipas
Buildings and structures in Hidalgo County, Texas
Transportation in Hidalgo County, Texas
Bridges completed in 2010
Toll bridges in Texas
Toll bridges in Mexico
2010 establishments in Texas
2010 establishments in Mexico